Bryan Foods is an American meat company founded in 1936 by John H. Bryan, Sr and W.B. Bryan in West Point, Mississippi.

Information
The company was acquired in 1968 by Sara Lee Corporation, now Hillshire Brands which was later acquired by Tyson Foods, Inc.  Its headquarters was originally in West Point, and then Cincinnati, Ohio, before moving to Downers Grove, Illinois. Bryan Foods products are primarily available for sale in the Southern United States.

Products
The products that Bryan Foods sells to consumers include the following:
Hotdogs 
Smoked sausage
Lunch meat
Cocktail smokies
Ham
Corn dogs
Bacon
Breakfast sausage

References

External links
Bryan Foods official website
History with Sara Lee Corporation

American companies established in 1936
Food and drink companies established in 1936
Meat processing in the United States
Meat companies of the United States
Food and drink companies based in Illinois
Manufacturing companies based in Illinois
Companies based in DuPage County, Illinois
Sara Lee Corporation
Downers Grove, Illinois
Clay County, Mississippi
1936 establishments in Mississippi